Lampranthus spectabilis, the trailing iceplant (a name it shares with other members of its family), is a species of flowering plant in the family Aizoaceae, native to the Cape Provinces of South Africa. The unimproved species and a number of cultivars are commercially available, including 'Tresco Apricot', 'Tresco Brilliant', 'Tresco Fire', 'Tresco Orange', 'Tresco Peach', 'Tresco Pearl', 'Tresco Purple', and 'Tresco Red'.

Phytochemistry
L. spectabilis contains mesembrenol and low levels of related alkaloids such as mesembrenone and have sometimes been mismarketed as Kanna (Sceletium tortuosum) extract which contains higher levels of related alkaloids.

References

spectabilis
Garden plants of Southern Africa
Endemic flora of South Africa
Flora of the Cape Provinces
Plants described in 1930
Taxa named by N. E. Brown
Taxa named by Adrian Hardy Haworth